The fourth season of the American competitive reality television series MasterChef premiered on Fox on May 22, 2013 and concluded on September 11, 2013.

Luca Manfè was the winner of this season, making him the first previous season returnee to win MasterChef after failing to make past the audition round in season 3. Natasha Crnjac was the runner-up.

Top 19

Elimination table

 (WINNER) This cook won the competition.
 (RUNNER-UP) This cook finished in second place.
 (WIN) The cook won an individual challenge (Mystery Box Challenge or Elimination Test).
 (WIN) The cook was on the winning team in the Team Challenge and directly advanced to the next round.
 (HIGH) The cook was one of the top entries in the individual challenge but didn't win.
 (IN) The cook wasn't selected as a top or bottom entry in an individual challenge.
 (IN) The cook wasn't selected as a top or bottom entry in a team challenge.
 (IMM) The cook didn't have to compete in that round of the competition.
 (IMM) The cook was selected by Mystery Box Challenge winner and didn't have to compete in the Elimination Test.
 (PT) The cook was on the losing team in the Team Challenge and competed in the Pressure Test, and advanced.
 (NPT) The cook was on the losing team in the Team Challenge, did not compete in the Pressure Test, and advanced.
 (RET) The cook won the Reinstation Challenge and returned to the competition.
 (LOW) The cook was one of the bottom entries in an individual challenge or Pressure Test, but advanced.
 (LOW) The cook was one of the bottom entries in the Team Challenge, but advanced.
 (ELIM) The cook was eliminated from MasterChef.

Guest judges
 Lidia Bastianich - Episode 9
 Christine Hà - Episode 11
 Eva Longoria - Episode 13
 Paula Deen - Episode 22

Episodes

References

2013 American television seasons
MasterChef (American TV series)